Heald Stream Falls is a waterfall in Maine, United States, about  from the US–Canada border. It is composed of a horsetail and cascades that drop about 18 feet (6 m).

Sources

Waterfalls of Maine
Landforms of Somerset County, Maine
Cascade waterfalls